Dracontium is a genus of flowering plants similar to those of Amorphophallus. Unlike Amorphophallus which is found in the Old World, this genus has a New World distribution and is native to South America, Central America, southern Mexico, and the West Indies.

Dracontium species can be distinguished from related genera by their inflorescence, which is smaller and unisexual. The plant has a large tuber similar to that of Amorphophallus, but rounder, and with no central and circular scar mark. When Dracontium plants begin to flower, the tuber swells and smoothens.

Species 
More than 20 Dracontium species have been described:

 Dracontium amazonense G.H.Zhu & Croat - Venezuela, Peru, northwestern Brazil
 Dracontium angustispathum G.H.Zhu & Croat - Colombia, Peru
 Dracontium asperispathum G.H.Zhu & Croat - Colombia, Peru, Ecuador
 Dracontium asperum K. Koch - Puerto Rico, Dominican Republic, Trinidad, Windward Islands, Venezuela, Peru, northwestern Brazil, the Guianas
 Dracontium bogneri G.H.Zhu & Croat - Brazil
 Dracontium croatii G.H.Zhu - Carchi and Pichincha Provinces in Ecuador
 Dracontium dubium Kunth - Venezuela, Guyana
 Dracontium gigas (Seem.) Engl. - Nicaragua, Costa Rica
 Dracontium grandispathum G.H.Zhu & Croat - Ecuador
 Dracontium grayumianum G.H.Zhu & Croat - Panama, Colombia
 Dracontium guianense G.H.Zhu & Croat - French Guiana
 Dracontium iquitense E.C.Morgan & J.A.Sperling - Loreto region of eastern Peru
 Dracontium longipes Engl. - Peru, Acre State of Brazil
 Dracontium margaretae Bogner - Venezuela, Brazil, Bolivia, Paraguay
 Dracontium nivosum (Lem.) G.H.Zhu - Pará, Maranhão
 Dracontium peruvianum G.H.Zhu & Croat - Peru, northwestern Brazil
 Dracontium pittieri Engl. - Costa Rica
 Dracontium plowmanii G.H.Zhu & Croat - Peru
 Dracontium polyphyllum L. - Pará, French Guiana, Suriname, Venezuela, Peru, Puerto Rico
 Dracontium prancei G.H.Zhu & Croat - Amazonas and Roraima States of northwestern Brazil
 Dracontium purdieanum (Schott) Engl. - Colombia, Venezuela
 Dracontium soconuscum Matuda - Chiapas, Costa Rica, Panama
 Dracontium spruceanum (Schott) G.H.Zhu - Costa Rica, Panama, Colombia, Venezuela, northwestern Brazil, Ecuador, Peru, Suriname
 Dracontium ulei K.Krause - Acre State in western Brazil; Pando region of northern Bolivia

References 

 
Araceae genera